Martin Allen (born 1965) is an English football manager and a retired footballer.

Martin Allen may also refer to:

Martin Allen (entrepreneur) (born 1930), American computer company founder
Martin Allen (writer), English playwright and screenwriter
Martin F. Allen (1842–1927), American banker, businessman, farmer and politician from Vermont
Martin Allen (numismatist), British numismatist and historian
Martin Allen (publicist) (born 1958), Welsh publicist and historical revisionist
Disappearance of Martin Allen (1964–1979)

See also
Marty Allen (1922–2018), American stand-up comedian and actor

Allen (surname)